Michael Edward Harper (born December 9, 1957) is a former American professional basketball player who played for the Portland Trail Blazers of the National Basketball Association (NBA) from 1980 to 1982.

Early years
After graduating from Chicago's Quigley South High School,  Harper played college basketball at North Park University, where he led teams to three consecutive NCAA Division III national basketball championships.

Personal life
Following his basketball career, Harper became an insurance agent. He also serves as a board member for the Oregon Liquor Control Commission.

References

External links
 Lewis & Clark coaching profile
 

1957 births
Living people
American expatriate basketball people in France
American expatriate basketball people in Italy
American expatriate basketball people in Spain
American men's basketball players
Basketball players from Chicago
CB Canarias players
Fulgor Libertas Forlì players
Insurance agents
Lewis & Clark Pioneers men's basketball coaches
North Park Vikings men's basketball players
Olympique Antibes basketball players
Pallacanestro Trieste players
Portland Trail Blazers draft picks
Portland Trail Blazers players
Power forwards (basketball)